Gleadovia is a genus of flowering plants belonging to the family Orobanchaceae.

Its native range is western Himalaya, Assam (in India) to southern China.

The genus name of Gleadovia is in honour of Frank Gleadow (1856–1930), an English forester and plant collector in India who discovered this plant. It was first described and published in J. Asiat. Soc. Bengal, Pt. 2, Nat. Hist. Vol.69 on page 488 in 1901.

Known species:
Gleadovia banerjiana 
Gleadovia konyakianorum 
Gleadovia mupinensis 
Gleadovia ruborum

References

Orobanchaceae
Orobanchaceae genera
Plants described in 1901
Flora of Assam (region)
Flora of China
Flora of West Himalaya